Dean Sewell (b 1972) is an Australian documentary photographer. He has won a number of awards. He lives in Sydney.

Life and work
Sewell grew up in Sydney and started his career as a news photographer for The Sydney Morning Herald.

His first major award was in 1994 when he received the Nikon-Walkley Australian Press Photographer of the Year.

Based in Moscow in 1996 and 1997, Sewell covered the First Chechen War and Russian Federal Elections as well as documenting social issues in the Post-Soviet states.

Sewell's series on The Block, an Aboriginal community in Redfern, an inner suburb of Sydney, was showcased at the Visa pour l'image festival of photojournalism in Perpignan, France.

In 2001, Sewell was a co-founder of the Australian documentary photography collective Oculi.

In 2004, Sewell flew to Aceh just after the 2004 Indian Ocean earthquake and tsunami and photographed the aftermath. His work won a World Press Photo award.

Awards

 1994 – Nikon-Walkley Australian Press Photographer of the Year
 1998 – Nikon-Walkley Australian Press Photographer of the Year
 2000 – World Press Photo Award – 2nd Place – People in the News category – East Timor independence
 2001 – Leica/Centre for Contemporary Photography (CCP) Documentary Photography Award – Highly commended 'Cave Clan'
 2002 – World Press Photo Award (3rd Place) – Nature and the Environment category – Australian bushfires
 2003 – Finalist – Energex Arbour Contemporary Art Prize
 2003 – Finalist – Agfa, Das BildForum 7th International Prize for Young Photojournalists
 2004 – Finalist, Josephine Ulrick National Photography Prize – 'Lara'
 2005 – World Press Photo Award – Spot News Stories – Aceh Tsunami aftermath
 2006 – Winner, Australia's Top Photographers, Photojournalism 
 2007 – Finalist, Head On portrait prize, Australian Centre for Photography
 2009 – Finalist, National Photographic Portrait Prize – 'Common Ground'
 2009 – Moran Contemporary Photography Prize – 'A Dry Argument' Murray Darling Basin

References

External links 
Sewell's page on the Oculi site

Australian photographers
1972 births
Living people
Documentary photographers